Herbert Edelman (November 5, 1933 – July 21, 1996) was an American actor of stage, film and television. He was twice nominated for an Emmy Award for his television work. One of his best-known roles was as Stanley Zbornak, the ex-husband of Dorothy Zbornak (played by Beatrice Arthur) on The Golden Girls. He also had a recurring role on the 1980s medical drama St. Elsewhere.

Early life and career
Edelman was born in New York City in the borough of Brooklyn. Before becoming an actor, Edelman studied to become a veterinarian at Cornell University, but left during his first year. After serving in the United States Army as an announcer for Armed Forces Radio, he enrolled in Brooklyn College as a theater student, but eventually dropped out. He later worked as a hotel manager and as a taxicab driver. One of his fares was director Mike Nichols, who in 1963 cast Edelman in his breakthrough Broadway role, as the bewildered telephone repairman in Neil Simon's Barefoot in the Park. Edelman reprised his role in the 1967 film version (starring Robert Redford and Jane Fonda).

He appeared as Murray the Cop in the movie version of Simon's The Odd Couple (1968) and later appeared in Simon's  California Suite (1978). He also had a role in The Way We Were (1973) and in an installment of the Japanese movie series Otoko wa Tsurai yo in 1979.

He remains best known for his three decades in television, usually as a co-star, recurring character, or guest star on CHIPS, The Golden Girls, That Girl, Love, American Style, The Streets of San Francisco, Maude, Cannon, Happy Days,  Welcome Back, Kotter, Kojak, Fantasy Island, Cagney & Lacey, and MacGyver, but occasionally in a lead role. In 1976, he starred in the  Saturday morning children's series Big John, Little John, as well as The Good Guys with Bob Denver (in what was Denver's first series after Gilligan's Island), from 1968 to 1970.

He also appeared with Bill Bixby and Valerie Perrine in Bruce Jay Friedman's Steambath, a controversial PBS dramedy, during 1973. From 1984 to 1988, he had a recurring role on St. Elsewhere. Edelman also appeared in ten episodes of Murder, She Wrote between 1984 and 1995, most frequently appearing as New York Police Department Lieutenant Artie Gelber. His last role was in an episode of Burke's Law.

Personal life and death
Edelman was married to soap opera actress Louise Sorel from 1964 to 1970; he had two children, Briana Edelman and Jacy Edelman. He was romantically linked with actress Christina Pickles from the mid-1980s until his death.

Herbert Edelman died of emphysema on July 21, 1996, in Los Angeles at the age of 62; he was then interred at Montefiore Cemetery in Springfield Gardens, Queens.

Filmography

Film

Television

Award nominations

References

External links

Classic Television Archive: Quinn Martin's Tales of the Unexpected (1977)

Male actors from New York City
American male film actors
American male stage actors
American male television actors
Brooklyn College alumni
Cornell University alumni
Deaths from emphysema
People from Brooklyn
1933 births
1996 deaths
United States Army soldiers
20th-century American male actors